Lolobo may refer to:
Lolobo, Vallée du Bandama, a town and sub-prefecture of Béoumi Department, Gbêkê Region, Vallée du Bandama District, Ivory Coast
Lolobo, Yamoussoukro, a town and sub-prefecture of the autonomous district of Yamoussoukro, Ivory Coast